Craig Victor II (born February 27, 1995) is an American professional basketball player for the GBA Lions of the Czech NBL. He played college basketball for the Arizona Wildcats and the LSU Tigers.

High school and college career 
After averaging 13.7 points and 8.6 boards a game for Findlay Prep in 2013–14, Victor spent his college freshman year at the University of Arizona, compiling averages of 3.1 points and 1.1 rebounds in eight contests wearing a Wildcat uniform.

He transferred to LSU in January 2015 and had to sit out until the end of the 2015 fall semester before making his debut for the Tigers in December 2015. Until the remainder of the 2015–16 season, he saw the court in 25 contests, averaging 11.5 points and 5.6 rebounds for LSU.

Victor missed the three opening games of the 2016-17 campaign due to suspension (violation of team rules) and then averaged 10.5 points as well as 7.6 rebounds in eight games. In late December 2016, he was dismissed from the LSU squad for another violation of team rules.

Professional career 
In April 2017, Victor declared for the 2017 NBA draft, but was not selected by any team. He then joined the Rio Grande Valley Vipers of the NBA G League for the 2017–18 season. He spent the 2019–20 season in Sweden with Djurgårdens IF Basket, averaging 27 points and 11.4 rebounds per game.

On August 12, 2020, Victor signed with Sloboda Tuzla of the Basketball Championship of Bosnia and Herzegovina and the ABA League Second Division. On October 8, Victor parted ways with the team. The same day, he signed with the Köping Stars in Sweden.

References

External links 
 LSU Tigers bio

1995 births
Living people
American men's basketball players
American expatriate basketball people in Bosnia and Herzegovina
American expatriate basketball people in Sweden
Arizona Wildcats men's basketball players
Basketball players from New Orleans
Findlay Prep alumni
OKK Sloboda Tuzla players
LSU Tigers basketball players
Rio Grande Valley Vipers players
Köping Stars players
Djurgårdens IF Basket players
Forwards (basketball)